The men's 50 kilometres walk competition of the athletics events at the 2011 Pan American Games took place on the 29 of October at the Guadalajara Circuit and Route. The defending Pan American Games champion was Xavier Moreno of Ecuador.

Records

Qualification standards
This event did not require any qualification standard be met.

Schedule

Abbreviations
All times shown are in hours:minutes:seconds

Results
16 athletes from 9 countries competed.

Final

References

Athletics at the 2011 Pan American Games
2011